13. Soba...  (trans. 13th room) is the second studio album by Bosnian rock band Zona Iskljuchenja (trans. Exclusion Zone), released on November 13, 2008, by Hayat Production.
 
Number "13" in the title was symbolizing period of the band's existence, while "room" was referred to the state of mind, closing into own room, into the own exclusion zone.
On this album, band turned their trust to the producer Marin Mestrovic, who worked on mastering and postproduction on the first album. Therefore this material was completely recorded, mixed and produced in Marin's owned studio "Amadeus" and unlike the previous album, songs were more balanced, in hard rock genre with elements of Bosnian folklore and modern sounds
 
Zona released an early single and music video "Boje jeseni" (trans. colors of autumn), an acoustic song that presented the band in completely different environment.
Upon release of the album, Zona has published yet another music video "Grad" ("the town"). The album contains 13 songs with few curiosities. Track No.8 called "Tisina" (trans. silence) is actually 13 seconds of silence, and the following track is called "Poslusaj pjesmu pod rednim brojem 8" (trans. listen to the song under the track number 8), which is the only song that is motivated by the bad socio-political situation in post-war Bosnia and Herzegovina
Just like on the previous album, this one also contains Zona's rock version of yet another Bosnian sevdalinka, Emina.

Track listing

References

External links
 Zona Iskljuchenja- Official Youtube Channel
 Zona Iskljuchenja - Twitter Official
 Zona Iskljuchenja - Soundcloud Official
 Zona Iskljuchenja - Facebook page

2008 albums